Gentlemen's Agreement is a 1935 British, black-and-white, adventure film directed by George Pearson and starring Frederick Peisley as Guy Carfax and Vivien Leigh as Phil Stanley. It was produced by British & Dominions Film Corporation and Paramount British Pictures. According to the British Film Institute, there is no known print of this film.

Synopsis
A young doctor realises that his father is a quack.

Cast
 Frederick Peisley as Guy Carfax
 Vivien Leigh as Phil Stanley
 Anthony Holles as Bill Bentley
 David Horne as Sir Charles Lysle
 Vera Bogetti as Dora Deleamere
 Victor Stanley as Williams
 Ronald Shiner as Jim Ferrin
 Kate Saxon as Mrs. Ferrin

References

External links
 
 
 
 

1935 films
1935 adventure films
British black-and-white films
1930s English-language films
Films directed by George Pearson
British adventure films
Films produced by Anthony Havelock-Allan
British and Dominions Studios films
Films shot at Imperial Studios, Elstree
Lost British films
1935 lost films
Lost adventure films
1930s British films